Callipurbeckia  is an extinct genus of neopterygian ray-finned fish from the Jurassic and Cretaceous periods. Fossils have been found in Germany, Tanzania, and England. It contains three species, which were previously classified in the related genus Lepidotes.

References

Lepisosteiformes
Prehistoric bony fish genera
Jurassic bony fish
Cretaceous bony fish
Prehistoric fish of Africa
Mesozoic fish of Europe